Alfonso Loera Pico (born December 4, 1978) is a Mexican former professional footballer.

Career
Loera began his career with Chivas de Guadalajara in 2000 after impressing the team's coaching staff at an open tryout. He played for one of Chivas's farm teams, La Piedad, and then spent part of the 2005 Major League Soccer season with C.D. Chivas USA before being released by at the end of the 2005 season.

After a couple of years playing in the Mexican lower leagues with CD Tapatio and Guerreros de Tabasco Loera signed with the Rochester Rhinos in the USL First Division on July 30, 2007. He played only two games in his debut season, but was a regular starter during the 2008 season.

External links
 
 
 

1978 births
Living people
Association football defenders
People from Ensenada, Baja California
Footballers from Baja California
Chivas USA players
C.D. Guadalajara footballers
Rochester New York FC players
Expatriate soccer players in the United States
USL First Division players
Major League Soccer players
Mexican footballers